Majere is a small village and tiny municipality in Kežmarok District in the Prešov Region of north Slovakia.

History
In historical records the village was first mentioned in 1431. Majere had been also known by its German name Oberschwaben.

Geography
The municipality lies at an altitude of 475 metres and covers an area of 1.331 km² . It has a population of about 82 people.

References

External links
https://web.archive.org/web/20110308033349/http://www.mesta-obce.sk/presovsky-kraj/okres-kezmarok/majere/

Villages and municipalities in Kežmarok District